The 2004 Formula BMW ADAC season was a multi-event motor racing championship for open wheel, formula racing cars held across Europe. The championship featured drivers competing in 1.2 litre Formula BMW single seat race cars. The 2004 season was the seventh Formula BMW ADAC season organized by BMW Motorsport and ADAC. The season began at Hockenheimring on 17 April and finished at the same place on 3 October, after twenty races.

Sebastian Vettel dominated the championship winning 18 of the 20 races, on his way to championship title.

Driver lineup

2004 Schedule
The series supported the Deutsche Tourenwagen Masters at nine rounds, with additional round at the European Grand Prix on 29–30 May.

Results

Standings
Points are awarded as follows:

† — Drivers did not finish the race, but were classified as they completed over 90% of the race distance.

References

External links
 Formula BMW ADAC 2004 on adac-motorsport.de

Formula BMW seasons
Formula BMW ADAC
BMW ADAC